Dallardsville is an unincorporated community in Polk County, Texas, United States. In 2000, the community had approximately 350 residents.

The Big Sandy Independent School District serves area students.

References

External links
 

Unincorporated communities in Polk County, Texas
Unincorporated communities in Texas